NTV Variety is a satellite cable channel operated by Next TV in Taiwan.

But on November 1, 2012, will from "NextVOD" redirect to Chunghwa Telcom's IPTV(MOD) to continue serving this channel.

External links
 NTV Variety official website

2010 establishments in Taiwan
Television stations in Taiwan
Television channels and stations established in 2010